The royal tern (Thalasseus maximus) is a tern in the family Laridae. The species is endemic to the Americas, though strays have been identified in Europe.

Taxonomy
The royal tern was described by the French polymath Georges-Louis Leclerc, Comte de Buffon in 1781 in his Histoire Naturelle des Oiseaux from a specimen collected in Cayenne, French Guiana. The bird was also illustrated in a hand-coloured plate engraved by François-Nicolas Martinet in the Planches Enluminées D'Histoire Naturelle which was produced under the supervision of Edme-Louis Daubenton to accompany Buffon's text. Neither the plate caption nor Buffon's description included a scientific name but in 1783 the Dutch naturalist Pieter Boddaert coined the binomial name Sterna maxima in his catalogue of the Planches Enluminées. The royal tern is now placed in the genus Thalasseus that was erected by the German zoologist Friedrich Boie in 1822.

The generic name is derived from the Ancient Greek θάλασσα :  thálassa meaning "sea". The specific epithet maximus is Latin for "greatest".

The royal tern belongs to the class Aves and the order Charadriiformes. Charadriiformes are mainly seabirds of small to medium-large size. The royal tern is also in the family Sternidae because of its white plumage, black cap on its head, long bill, webbed feet, and bodies that are more streamlined than those of gulls.

The taxonomy of the royal tern has been debated, whether the correct scientific name was Thalasseus maximus or Sterna maxima. It is presently classified as Thalasseus maximus, which places it with seven other terns. The royal tern was originally placed in the genus Sterna; however, a 2005 study suggest that it is actually part of the genus Thalasseus.

The West African crested tern (Thalasseus albididorsalis) was formerly considered to be a subspecies of royal tern. It was elevated to species status in January 2021.

Description
 

This is a large tern, second only to the Caspian tern but is unlikely to be confused with the carrot-billed giant, which has extensive dark under-wing patches.

The royal tern has an orange-red bill, pale grey upper parts and white under parts. Its legs are black. In winter, the black cap becomes patchy. Juvenile royal terns are similar to non-breeding adults. Differences include juveniles having black splotched wings and a yellower bill.

The calls of the royal tern are usually short, clear shrills. Some of the shrills sound like kree or tsirr; the royal tern also has a more plover like whistle that is longer, rolling and is more melodious.

In parts of its range, the royal tern could be confused with the elegant tern, but the elegant tern has a longer, more curved, bill and shows more white on the forehead in winter.

Distribution and habitat

The royal tern is found on both coasts of the Americas. In the east during the breeding season (April to July) it is primarily found from Texas to Virginia. There are scattered breeding records as far north as Long Island, New York, coastally as far south as French Guiana, and on several Caribbean islands. Isolated breeding sites have been found in Argentina. The wintering range in the east is from North Carolina south to Panama and the Guianas and throughout the Caribbean. The western population nests from California to Mexico and winters from California south to Peru. Argentinian breeders may disperse into Brazil.

Behavior

Feeding

The royal tern typically feeds in small secluded bodies of water such as estuaries, mangroves, and lagoons. The royal tern feeds in salt water and on very rare occasions in fresh water. When feeding they fly long distances from the colony to forage. The royal tern feeds by diving into the water from heights near . They usually feed alone or in groups of two or three, but on occasion they feed in large groups when hunting large schools of fish.

The royal tern usually feeds on small fish such as anchovies, weakfish, and croakers. Fish are their main source of food but they also eat insects, shrimp, and crabs. The royal tern feeds on small crabs, such as young blue crabs that swim near the surface of the water. When feeding on small crabs the royal tern does not use its normal plunge-dive technique, but instead uses short shallow dives so that they are concealed from their prey. The royal tern also uses this technique when hunting flying fish.

Breeding

The royal tern nests on island beaches or isolated beaches with limited predators. It lays one or two eggs, usually in a scrape, an area on the ground where a tern has made a small hole to lay its eggs. In some cases, tern eggs are laid directly on the ground, not in a scrape. The eggs incubate from 25 to 30 days; after the eggs hatch the chicks remain in the scrape for about a week. About two weeks after hatching the chicks gather into groups called a crèche. When the chicks are in the crèche, they are primarily fed by their parents who recognize their offspring by their voice and looks. While the chicks are in the crèche, they usually roam freely around the colony. In a large colony there can be thousands of chicks in the crèche. When the chicks are a month old they fledge or start to fly. Royal terns mature around the age of 4 years, after which they build their own nests and reproduce.

Threats

The royal tern has few predators when it is mature, but before the chicks hatch or while they are chicks the tern is threatened by humans, other animals, and the tides. Humans threaten terns by fishing and by disrupting the tern nesting sites. Fishing nets can catch a tern while it is diving, making it unable to feed or it may cause it to drown if it is caught under water. Animals such as foxes, raccoon, and large gulls prey on tern chicks and tern eggs.

Tern nesting sites can also be affected by the tides; if a tern colony has nested too close to the high tide mark a spring tide would flood the nesting site and kill the chicks and make unhatched eggs infertile.

Conservation

The IUCN has rated the royal tern as of Least Concern.

References

External links

 
 
 

royal tern
Royal tern
Birds of South America
Birds of the Caribbean
Birds of the Dominican Republic
Birds of Mexico
Native birds of the Eastern United States
Native birds of the Southeastern United States
Royal tern